Archicad library part is the basic item through which the CAD software Archicad handles external dynamic content elements which are grouped into libraries. A library part is a file in a library.

A library part can be any file used by Archicad for the following purposes:
 a file with GSM extension containing a model written in GDL or using 2D- or 3D binaries
 a background image for rendering
 an image for texture mapping for 3D and rendering
 a text file for listing
 a LightWorks material file (LWI)
 a DXF file
 a file of any type, which is registered by Archicad or by an add-on as library part through Library Manager

Usually a library part refers to an object scripted in GDL.

See also
 Archicad
 Geometric Description Language

External links
GDL Object Downloads
Graphisoft's GDL Object Depository 
Graphisoft's BIMcomponents portal 
manufacturers' BIM object libraries - manuBIM

CAD file formats